"Hundred Million" is a song by Canadian rock band Treble Charger. It was released as the lead single from the band's fourth album, Detox. The song features backing vocals by Deryck Whibley and percussion by Steve Jocz, both from Sum 41. The song received a CASBY Award for "Favourite New Single" in 2002.

The song is featured in the EA Sports hockey game NHL 2003.

Music video
The music video for "Hundred Million" was filmed on May 27, 2002 in Toronto. The video was directed by Wendy Morgan and features cameos from several Canadian artists including Avril Lavigne, Gob, Sum 41, and Swollen Members. It became one of the top music videos of 2002 in Canada.

Near the end of the video, Tom Thacker mooned, although it was frequently mistaken to be Lavigne. This misconception was referenced to when Lavigne pulled her pants halfway down to reveal MMVA written there at the 2003 MuchMusic Video Awards.

Awards and nominations
The video was nominated for five awards at the 2003 MuchMusic Video Awards, winning for MuchLoud Best Rock Video and video director Wendy Morgan winning for Best Director.

The video reached the #1 spot on MuchMusic Countdown for the week of October 4, 2002.

Credits and personnel
Credits and personnel are adapted from the Detox album liner notes.
 Greig Nori – writer, vocals, guitar
 Bill Priddle – writer, vocals, guitar
 Rosie Martin – writer, bass
 Trevor MacGregor – writer, drums
 Deryck Whibley – additional vocals
 Ben Cook – additional vocals
 Matt Hyde – producer, engineering 
 Paul Forgues – engineering, digital editing
 Ed Krautner – additional engineering, digital editing
 Greg Kolchinsky – assistant engineer
 Dan Druff – guitar tech
 Tom Lord-Alge – mixing at South Beach Studios (Miami Beach)
 Ted Jensen – mastering at Sterling Sound (New York City)

References

External links

2002 singles
Treble Charger songs
2002 songs
ViK. Recordings singles
Songs written by Greig Nori